This is a list of original Roman Catholic hymns. The list does not contain hymns originating from other Christian traditions despite occasional usage in Roman Catholic churches. The list has hymns in Latin and English.

A   
 A Message Came to A Maiden Young  
 Accept Almighty Father 
 Adeste Fideles
 Adoramus te
 Adoro te devote
 Agnus Dei
 All Glory, Laud and Honour
 All of seeing, all of hearing 
 Alleluia!  Alleluia!  Praise the Lord 
 Alleluia!  Alleluia!  Sing a New Song to the Lord
 Alleluia!  Sing to Jesus 
 Alma Redemptoris Mater
 Angels We Have Heard on High
 Anima Christi (Soul of my Saviour) 
 Asperges me
 As a Deer
 At That First Eucharist  
 At the Lamb's High Feast We Sing 
 At the Name of Jesus 
 Attende Domine
 Aurora lucis rutilat
 Ave Maria
 Ave maris stella
 Ave Sanctissima 
 Ave verum corpus

 B 
 Be Joyful Mary
 Be Forgiven  
 Be Thou My Vision
 Behold a simple tender Babe
 Before the Sun Burned Bright  
 Blessed Are They  
 Break Forth, O Beauteous Heav'nly Light
 Bring Flowers of the Fairest (Queen of the May)

 C 
 Canticle of Simeon (Nunc dimittis)
 Canticle of the Blessed Virgin (Magnificat)
 Canticle of the Three Children
 Careworn Mother Stood Attending
 Come, Creator Spirit
 Come Down, O Love Divine
 Come, Holy Ghost 
 Come, Lord, and Tarry Not 
 Come My Way, My Truth, My Life 
 Come, rejoice Before Your Maker 
 Come, Thou Holy Spirit, Come 
 Come To My Mercy
 Come, Ye Faithful, Raise the Strain 
 Comfort, Comfort Ye My People
 Creator of the Earth and Skies
 Creator Spirit, By Whose Aid 
 Crown Him With Many Crowns
 Cry Out With Joy
Come Lord, Maranatha

 D 
 Daughter of a Mighty Father
 Dies irae

 E 
 Emmanuel
 Evviva Maria''

F 
 Faith Of Our Fathers
 Father, We Thank Thee
 For All The Saints

G 
 Gaude Maria Virgo
 Gift of Finest Wheat
 Gloria in excelsis Deo
 Glorious Things Of Thee Are Spoken (by the Anglican John Newton)
 Glory to God in the Highest
 God of Mercy and Compassion
 Guardian Angel, from heaven so bright

H 
 Heart of Jesus
 Help of Christians, guard this land
 Holy God, We Praise Thy Name
 Holy, Holy, Holy

I 
 I Am the Bread of Life
 In dulci jubilo
 Immaculate Mary
 In Splendoribus Sanctorum
 Iste confessor

J 
 Jesu dulcis memoria
 Jesu, Jesu
 Jesus, in your Heart we find

L 
 Lauda Sion
 Laudate Dominum
 Laudate omnes gentes
 Let All Mortal Flesh Keep Silence
 Little Hymn to Saint Joseph
 Lo, How a Rose E'er Blooming
 Lord of All Hopefulness
 Lucis creator optime
 Lumen Christi

M 
 Magnificat
 Mary Immaculate, Star of the Morning
 May Flights of Angels Lead You on Your Way
 Mother Dear
 Mother Dearest, Mother Fairest
 Mountains May Fall

N 
 Nunc dimittis
 Norwegia Catholica

O 
 O bread of heaven
 O Come, All Ye Faithful
 O Deus ego amo te
 O filii et filiæ
 O Lord I am Not Worthy
 O Mother of perpetual help
 O salutaris hostia
 O sanctissima
 O sodales
 O Antiphons

P 
 Pange lingua gloriosi corporis mysterium
 Pange lingua gloriosi proelium certaminis
 Panis angelicus
 Parce Domine
 Piae Cantiones
 Pontifical Anthem

R 
 Regina caeli
 Requiem aeternam
 Rerum Creator Optime
 Rex Sempiterne Cælitum
 Rorate caeli

S 
 Sacra jam splendent
 Salve Regina
 Sancti venite
 Sanctorum Meritis
 Sanctus, Sanctus, Sanctus
 Stabat Mater
 Sing Praise To Our Creator
 Sing, sing, ye angel bands
 Soul of My Savior
 Surrexit Christus hodie
 Sweet Sacrament Divine

T 
 Tantum ergo
 Te Deum
 Te lucis ante terminum
 There's a Wideness in God's Mercy
 They'll Know We Are Christians
 This day he gave to me
 Thou Lady bright

U 
 Ubi caritas

V 
 Veni Creator Spiritus
 Veni redemptor gentium
 Veni Sancte Spiritus
 Vexilla Regis
 Victimae paschali laudes
 Vidi aquam
 Vox clara ecce intonat

W 

 Water of Life
 We Praise You, Father For Your Gifts
 Where Charity and Love Prevail

See also 
 :Category:Catholic hymns in German

References 

Catholic hymns
Catholic liturgy
Latin-language Christian hymns